Bennett-Tobler-Pace-Oliver House, also known as the Oliver House, is a historic home located at Jackson, Cape Girardeau County, Missouri.  It was built in 1848, and is a two-story, five bay, "L"-shaped, Greek Revival style brick dwelling. It has a one-story addition and a two-story service wing.  It features a two-story porch on the front facade.

It was listed on the National Register of Historic Places in 1985.

References

Houses on the National Register of Historic Places in Missouri
Greek Revival houses in Missouri
Houses completed in 1848
Houses in Cape Girardeau County, Missouri
National Register of Historic Places in Cape Girardeau County, Missouri